Chanteloup may refer to several communes in France:

Chanteloup, Eure, in the Eure département 
Chanteloup, Ille-et-Vilaine, in the Ille-et-Vilaine département
Chanteloup, Manche, in the Manche département 
Chanteloup, Deux-Sèvres, in the Deux-Sèvres département
Chanteloup-en-Brie, in the Seine-et-Marne département 
Chanteloup-les-Bois, in the Maine-et-Loire département 
Chanteloup-les-Vignes, in the Yvelines département

It may also refer to:
 Château de Chanteloup, a former château in the Indre-et-Loire département